Jan Hrušínský (born 9 June 1955) is a Czech actor. He has appeared in 56 films and television shows since 1970. He starred in the 1974 film Kdo hledá zlaté dno, which was entered into the 25th Berlin International Film Festival. He is a son of the Czech actor Rudolf Hrušínský.

Selected filmography
 Kdo hledá zlaté dno (1974)
 My Brother Has a Cute Brother (1975)
 Love Between the Raindrops (1979)
 Želary (2003)
 Beauty in Trouble (2006)

References

External links
 

1955 births
Living people
Czech male film actors
Male actors from Prague
20th-century Czech male actors
21st-century Czech male actors
Czech male stage actors
Prague Conservatory alumni